The 2020 South Korean Athletics Championships was the 74th edition of the national championship in outdoor track and field for athletes in South Korea. It was held between 25–28 June in Jeongseon County.

Results

Men

Women

References

Results
Korean Ch. Jeongseon (KOR) 25–28 JUN 2020. World Athletics. Retrieved 2021-03-20.
 Results from Top Lists. World Athletics Retrieved 2021-03-20.

External links
Korean Athletics Federation website

2020
South Korean Championships
South Korean Athletics Championships
Sport in Gangwon Province, South Korea
Jeongseon County
South Korean Athletics Championships, 2020
June 2020 sports events in South Korea